Robert Carswell (born 19 March 1936) is a New Zealand cricketer. He played in one first-class match for Northern Districts in 1957/58.

See also
 List of Northern Districts representative cricketers

References

External links
 

1936 births
Living people
New Zealand cricketers
Northern Districts cricketers
Cricketers from Gisborne, New Zealand